Maria Belooussova was a Russian pianist. She lived and worked in Paris.

Biography 
Belooussova was born in Yekaterinburg and studied music there. She joined the Russian Musical Academy in Moscow, in the class of Vladimir Tropp. In 1992, she joined the National Conservatory of Music in Paris, in the class of Christian Ivaldi. From 1999, Belooussova taught chamber music at the Conservatoire de Paris. She died from cancer on May 30, 2018.

Works 
Belooussova was mainly interested in the chamber music repertoire. She played with many personalities including Ivry Gitlis, Bernard Greenhouse, Joseph Silverstein, Jean-Jacques Kantorow, Wolfgang Holzmair and Michel Strauss. She was also very attached to the contemporary music repertoire with the composers Krzysztof Penderecki, Sofia Goubaïdoulina, Philippe Hersant or Thierry Escaich.

In 1999, she joined the musical ensemble Musique Oblique composed of violinists Frédéric Laroque, Martial Gauthier and Daniel Vagner, cellist Diana Ligeti and clarinettist Rémi Lerner, with whom she recorded various albums.

In 2011, she created the piano duo, Les claviers de Giverny, with Raphael Drouin.

Discography 

 Eastern Wind, Sergueï Rachmaninov (Composer) Reinhold Glière (Composer), Maja Bogdanovic (Cello), Belooussova (Piano), Orchid Classics, February 2018
 Musique de chambre à Giverny, Franz Schubert, Robert Schumann, composers, Michel Strauss, cello, Belooussova, piano, Hybrid music, 2010
 Mélodies, duos et pièces religieuses, Emmanuel de Fonscolombe, composer, Anna-Maria Panzarella, Mario Hacquard, Belooussova, pianist, Hybrid music, 2008
 Premières mélodies du XXIe siècle, Anthony Girard, Vincent Bouchot, Denis Chouillet, Françoise Masset, Alain Rizoul, guitar, Robert Expert, Maguelone, 2008
 Quintette au bord de l'Oise : for violin, viola, cello, double bass and piano, texts by Bertrand Tavernier, photographs of Olivier Verley, Antoine Duhamel's music, Belooussova, piano, Pierre Feyler, double bass, Françoise Perrin, violin, Valhermeil Edition, 2006
 Les liaisons dangereuses : selected excerpts from the soundtrack of the film Dangerous Liaisons / Bach, Brahms, Mozart comp., Tedi Papavrami, violin, Belooussova, piano, Pan Classics, 2003

References

External links 

20th-century births
2018 deaths
Russian classical pianists
Russian women pianists
Musicians from Paris
Women classical pianists
Russian emigrants to France
Musicians from Yekaterinburg
20th-century Russian musicians
20th-century Russian women musicians
20th-century classical pianists
20th-century French women musicians
21st-century Russian musicians
21st-century classical pianists
21st-century French women musicians
Conservatoire de Paris alumni
Academic staff of the Conservatoire de Paris
Women music educators
Year of birth missing
20th-century women pianists
21st-century women pianists